Scaphispatha is a genus of flowering plants in the family Araceae. It contains two species, S. gracilis and S. robusta. The genus was believed to be monotypic until 2003 when a new species, S. robusta was discovered by Eduardo Gomes Gonçalves in northern Brazil. The plant had been grown in cultivation for some years, but had always been assumed to be a Caladium until it flowered.

Scaphispatha gracilis Brongn. ex Schott - Bolivia, Brazil
Scaphispatha robusta E.G.Gonç. - Pará, Mato Grosso, Tocantins, Goiás

References

Aroideae
Araceae genera
Flora of South America
Taxa named by Adolphe-Théodore Brongniart
Taxa named by Heinrich Wilhelm Schott